Baryons are composite particles made of three quarks, as opposed to mesons, which are composite particles made of one quark and one antiquark. Baryons and mesons are both hadrons, which are particles composed solely of quarks or both quarks and antiquarks. The term baryon is derived from the Greek "βαρύς" (barys), meaning "heavy", because, at the time of their naming, it was believed that baryons were characterized by having greater masses than other particles that were classed as matter.

Until a few years ago, it was believed that some experiments showed the existence of pentaquarks – baryons made of four quarks and one antiquark. Prior to 2006 the particle physics community as a whole did not view the existence of pentaquarks as likely. On 13 July 2015, the LHCb collaboration at CERN reported results consistent with pentaquark states in the decay of bottom Lambda baryons (Λ).

Since baryons are composed of quarks, they participate in the strong interaction. Leptons, on the other hand, are not composed of quarks and as such do not participate in the strong interaction. The best known baryons are the protons and neutrons that make up most of the mass of the visible matter in the universe, whereas electrons, the other major component of atoms, are leptons. Each baryon has a corresponding antiparticle known as an antibaryon in which quarks are replaced by their corresponding antiquarks. For example, a proton is made of two up quarks and one down quark, while its corresponding antiparticle, the antiproton, is made of two up antiquarks and one down antiquark.

Baryon properties 
These lists detail all known and predicted baryons in total angular momentum J =  and J =  configurations with positive parity.

Baryons composed of one type of quark (uuu, ddd, ...) can exist in J =  configuration, but J =  is forbidden by the Pauli exclusion principle.
Baryons composed of two types of quarks (uud, uus, ...) can exist in both J =  and J =  configurations. 
Baryons composed of three types of quarks (uds, udc, ...) can exist in both J =  and J =  configurations.  Two J =  configurations are possible for these baryons.

The symbols encountered in these lists are: I (isospin), J (total angular momentum), P (parity), u (up quark), d (down quark), s (strange quark), c (charm quark), b (bottom quark), Q (charge), B (baryon number), S (strangeness), C (charm), B′ (bottomness), as well as a wide array of subatomic particles (hover for name). (See the baryon article for a detailed explanation of these symbols.)

Antibaryons are not listed in the tables; however, they simply would have all quarks changed to antiquarks, and Q, B, S, C, B′, would be of opposite signs. Particles with † next to their names have been predicted by the Standard Model but not yet observed. Values in parentheses have not been firmly established by experiments, but are predicted by the quark model and are consistent with the measurements.

JP = + baryons 

† Particle has not yet been observed.

[a]  The masses of the proton and neutron are known with much better precision in atomic mass units (u) than in MeV/c2, due to the relatively poorly known value of the elementary charge.

[b]  At least 1035 years. See proton decay.

[c]  For free neutrons; in most common nuclei, neutrons are stable.

[d]  PDG reports the resonance width (Γ). Here the conversion τ =  is given instead.

[e]  There is a controversial discovery claim, disfavored by other experimental data.

JP = + baryons 

† Particle has not yet been observed.

[h]  PDG reports the resonance width (Γ). Here the conversion τ =  is given instead.

Baryon resonance particles 
This table gives the name, quantum numbers (where known), and experimental status of baryons resonances confirmed by the PDG. Baryon resonance particles are excited baryon states with short half lives and higher masses. Despite significant research, the fundamental degrees of freedom behind baryon excitation spectra are still poorly understood. The spin-parity JP (when known) is given with each particle. For the strongly decaying particles, the JP values are considered to be part of the names, as is the mass for all resonances.

See also 
 Eightfold way (physics)
 List of mesons
 List of particles
 Roper resonance
 Timeline of particle discoveries

References

Bibliography

Further reading

External links 
 Particle Data Group – The Review of Particle Physics (2018)
 Georgia State University – HyperPhysics
 Baryons made thinkable, an interactive visualisation allowing physical properties to be compared

Baryons

fr:Baryon#Liste
it:Lista dei barioni